Tschuschen:power   is an Austrian television series.

See also
List of Austrian television series

External links
 

Austrian television series
2009 Austrian television series debuts
2009 Austrian television series endings
2000s Austrian television series
ORF (broadcaster)
German-language television shows